Mian Galalan (also Romanized as Mīān Galālān; also known as Mīān Kalālān) is a village in Susan-e Gharbi Rural District, Susan District, Izeh County, Khuzestan Province, Iran. At the 2006 census, its population was 31, in 5 families.

References 

Populated places in Izeh County